The Piano Trio No. 2 in G major, K. 496, was written by Wolfgang Amadeus Mozart in 1786. It is scored for piano, violin and cello.

Movements 
The work is in three movement form:

References

External links

Piano trios by Wolfgang Amadeus Mozart
Compositions in G major
1786 compositions